The Korean Ocean Shipping Agency is a state-owned North Korean shipping agency. It handles all business relating to incoming foreign ships, such as pilotage, logistics and food/water supply. It was founded in 1956 and joined the Baltic and International Maritime Council (BIMCO) in 1980.

See also 

List of companies of North Korea

Notes and references 

Shipping companies of North Korea